Hartley is a city in O'Brien County, Iowa, United States. The population was 1,605 in the 2020 census.

History
Hartley got its start around 1880, following construction of the Chicago, Milwaukee & St. Paul Railway through that territory. Hartley was named for a railroad official John Hartley.

Geography
Hartley is located at  (43.181847, −95.476328).

Major highways

Demographics

2010 census
As of the census of 2010, there were 1,672 people, 713 households, and 444 families living in the city. There were 789 housing units at an average density of 607 per square mile (239/km). The racial makeup of the city was 95.8% White, 0.4% Asian, 0.1% American Indian, 1.7% from other races, and 2.0% from two or more races. The city has a 4.4% Hispanic or Latino background.

There were 713 households, of which 26.8% had children under the age of 18 living with them, 49.8% were married couples living together, 8.6% had a female householder with no husband present, 3.9% had a male householder with no wife present, and 37.7% were non-families. Of all households, 33.8% were made up of individuals living alone, and 33.5% had someone living alone who was 65 years of age or older.  The average household size was 2.26 and the average family size was 2.89.

26.0% were under the age of 20, 4.4% from 20 to 24, 20.2% from 25 to 44, 27.3% from 45 to 64, and 22.1% were 65 years of age or older.  The median age was 44.3 years. For every 100 females, there were 91.3 males.

The median income for a household in the city was $40,795, and the median income for a family was $49,286. The per capita income for the city was $19,999.  About 11.8% of families and 19.7% of the population were below the poverty line, including 41.1% of those under age 18 and 18.6% of those age 65 or over.

2000 census
As of the census of 2000, there were 1,733 people, 726 households, and 461 families living in the city. The racial makeup of the city was 96.8% White, 0.8% African American, 0.1% Native American, 0.4% Asian, 0.9% from other races, and 1% from two or more races. Hispanic or Latino of any race were 4.7% of the population.

There were 726 households, out of which 29.3% had children under the age of 18 living with them, 53.6% were married couples living together, 6.9% had a female householder with no husband present, and 36.5% were non-families. Of all households, 32.6% were made up of individuals, and 18.9% had someone living alone who was 65 years of age or older. The average household size was 2.3 and the average family size was 2.3.

Of the population, 25.2% were under the age of 18, 5.9% from 18 to 24, 26.4% from 25 to 44, 18.5% from 45 to 64, and 24% 65 years of age or older. The median age was 40.1 years. For every 100 females, there were 88.8 males. For every 100 females age 18 and over, there were 84.0 males.

Arts and culture

Annual cultural events
Hartley celebrates Summerfest every year during the first weekend in August.

Parks and recreation

Golf
It was named Iowa's 2003 9-Hole Course of the Year.

The city also has three local parks: Neebel, which has a public swimming pool, Shinkle, and the Hartley–Melvin–Sanborn Elementary School park.

Education
Hartley is served by the Hartley–Melvin–Sanborn Community School District, which formed on July 1, 1991, with the merger of the Hartley–Melvin and Sanborn districts. The predecessor Hartley–Melvin district formed on July 1, 1981, through the merger of the Hartley and Melvin districts.

Hartley is home to both the Hartley–Melvin–Sanborn Elementary School and the Hartley–Melvin–Sanborn High School.

Olhausen Pool Hall
Hartley was the home of the Olhausen Pool Hall, which was the origin of the Olhausen Billiard Company of San Diego.

Notable people

 Everett Dunn (1892–1980), civil engineer and labor negotiator
 Jim Fanning (1927–2015), Major League Baseball catcher, manager and general manager
 Wesley Leonard "Cowboy" Fry (1902–1970), football player, coach of football and baseball

 Bonnie Linder (1927–2020), subject of a viral video
 Vicki Myron (born 1947), author of Dewey: The Small-Town Library Cat Who Touched the World
 Maurice Pate (1894–1965), co-founded United Nations Children's Fund (UNICEF) in 1947

See also

References

External links

 City of Hartley Portal style website, Government, Businesses, Community events and more
 Hartley-Melvin-Sanborn Public Schools
 City-Data Comprehensive Statistical Data and more about Hartley

Cities in Iowa
Cities in O'Brien County, Iowa